Cerro del León is a stratovolcano located in El Loa province, Antofagasta Region, Chile. It is part of the Chilean Central Volcanic Zone and forms a volcanic lineament with neighbouring Paniri and Toconce that was active into the Holocene. Cerro del León itself was constructed in three stages by andesitic–dacitic lava flows and was subject to glacial erosion.

Geology
Volcán Lagunita is a neighbouring volcano and is more heavily eroded and hydrothermally altered.

Regional setting
Cerro del León is part of the Central Volcanic Zone, a volcanic belt in the Andes. Volcanic activity occurs since the Oligocene and includes dacitic–rhyolitic ignimbrites. San Pedro and Lascar have historical activity, but only a few volcanoes have been studied, namely Lascar, Ollagüe and Parinacota.

It was constructed on top the Toconce and Sifon Ignimbrites. The alignment was active during the late Pleistocene–Holocene and contains San Pedro-San Pablo–Paniri–Cerro del León–Toconce–Linzor.

Eruption history
The volcano was constructed in various phases. The base of the volcano is constructed from andesitic lava flows that directly overlie the ignimbrite basement. These at first erupted in the west and east, subsequently northwest and southeast. Dacites and andesites form the last stage and the bulk of the edifice.

The volcano was subject to glaciation, leaving moraines down to  altitude, formed during the last glaciation 15,000–11,000 years ago. Glacial effects are noticeable on the north-northwest flanks.

Petrology
Lavas contain phenocrysts of plagioclase with variable amounts of biotite, clinopyroxene, opaque minerals and orthopyroxene. The matrix is glassy and contains hornblende and plagioclase. The lavas have vesicular and minor proportions of amygdaloid, porphyric, trachytic and vitrophyric texture. Hydrothermal alteration has been reported.

Religious importance 
Cerro del Leon is a holy mountain for the local territory. An Inca religious site is located on its summit.

See also
Cerro Chao
List of volcanoes in Chile
Cerro Paniri has a recent satellite photo of the region.

References

External links 
 

Volcanoes of Antofagasta Region
Mountains of Chile
Stratovolcanoes of Chile
Pleistocene stratovolcanoes